The Howrah–New Delhi Rajdhani Express is a  Rajdhani class train belonging to Eastern Railway zone that runs between  and  in India via . It is currently being operated with 12305/12306 train numbers on a weekly basis. It is widely regarded as one of the most premium trains on the Indian Railway network and is given the highest priority in terms of clearance.

Service

The 12305/Howrah–New Delhi Rajdhani Express has an average speed of 77 km/hr and covers 1531 km in 19h 55m. The 12306/New Delhi–Howrah Rajdhani Express has an average speed of 79 km/hr and covers 1531 km in 19h 20m.

Route and halts 

The important halts of the train are:

 
 
 
 
 
Pt. Deen Dayal Upadhyaya Junction

Coach composition

The train has standard LHB rakes with max speed of 130 kmph. The train consists of 22 coaches:

 2 First AC
 6 AC II Tier
 10 AC III Tier
 1 Pantry car
 2 End-on Generator
 1 High Capacity Parcel Van

Traction

Both trains are hauled by a Howrah Loco Shed-based WAP-7 electric locomotive from Howrah to New Delhi, and vice versa.

Rake Sharing 

The train shares its rake with 12301/12302 Howrah Rajdhani Express.

See also 

 Howrah railway station
 New Delhi railway station
 Howrah Rajdhani Express

Notes

References

External links 

 12305. Howrah New Delhi Kolkata Express Timetable
 12306. New Delhi Howrah Kolkata Express Timetable
 12305/Howrah - New Delhi Rajdhani Express India Rail Info
 12306/New Delhi - Howrah Rajdhani Express India Rail Info

Delhi–Kolkata trains
Rajdhani Express trains
Rail transport in West Bengal
Rail transport in Jharkhand
Rail transport in Bihar
Rail transport in Uttar Pradesh